Flight 816 may refer to

Pan Am Flight 816, crashed on 22 July 1973
Knight Air Flight 816, crashed on 24 May 1995

0816